Ejisu-Juaben Municipal District is a former district that was located in the Ashanti Region of Ghana. Originally created as an ordinary district assembly on 10 March 1989 when it was known as Ejisu-Juaben District which was created from the former Ejisu-Juaben-Bosomtwe District Council. It was later elevated to municipal district assembly status in 2007 (effectively 29 February 2008) to become Ejisu-Juaben Municipal District. However on 15 March 2018, it was split off into two new municipal districts: Ejisu Municipal District (capital: Ejisu) and Juaben Municipal District (capital: Juaben). The municipality was located in the central part of Ashanti Region and had Ejisu as its capital town.

Sources 
 
 GhanaDistricts.com

Districts of Ashanti Region